The River Tromie is a right bank tributary of the River Spey in northeast Scotland. It emerges from the northern end of Loch an t-Seilich within the Gaick Forest and flows northwards, then northwestwards down through Glen Tromie to Bhran Cottage where it turns to the north-northeast. It is bridged by the B970 road at Tromie Bridge near Drumguish and flows a further 1.25 miles (2 km) northwest to meet the Spey near Lynchat.

Loch an t-Seilich is fed by the Allt Loch an Duin which arises at Loch an Duin and passes through Loch Bhrodainn on its way north to Loch an t-Seilich, being joined on its right by the Allt Gharbh Ghaig before it does so.

Etymology 
The name 'Tromie' is an anglicisation of the Gaelic word for 'elder tree'.

References 

Tromie
1Tromie